Norman Harrison (born 13 May 1939) is an Australian sports shooter. He competed in the men's 50 metre free pistol event at the 1976 Summer Olympics.

References

1939 births
Living people
Australian male sport shooters
Olympic shooters of Australia
Shooters at the 1976 Summer Olympics
Place of birth missing (living people)
Commonwealth Games medallists in shooting
Commonwealth Games silver medallists for Australia
Shooters at the 1974 British Commonwealth Games
20th-century Australian people
21st-century Australian people
Medallists at the 1974 British Commonwealth Games